Comfort Doyoe Cudjoe-Ghansah (born 3 November 1967) is a Ghanaian politician and the Member of Parliament for Ada constituency. She served as the Minister of State in charge of Social and Allied Institutions. She is currently the Deputy Chief Whip in the Parliament of Ghana.

Early life and education 
Comfort Doyoe Cudjoe-Ghansah was born in Big Ada, Greater Accra Region on 3 November 1967. Comfort earned her Diploma in Stenographership from Royal Academy of Accounting, Accra in 1983. She earned a certificate in Radio and TV Presentation from the Ghana Institute of Journalism in 2011.

Political life 
Cudjoe-Ghansah is the Member of Parliament for Ada constituency, and sits on the committees for gender and children, and on foreign affairs. She was the Minister of State for the Ghanaian government on Social and Allied Institutions, having been named to the role in January 2013 by President of Ghana John Dramani Mahama. She denied accusations in 2014 that she had bribed assembly members to reject a District Chief Executive nominated by the President. Her name was cleared at an emergency meeting in the region.

She met with the Chinese Ambassador to Ghana later that year to discuss joint working on health and the well-being of children.

In 2016, she presented computers on behalf of the government to the head of the Ghanaian civil service, and over 500 desks to schools within her constituency. In a low key ceremony, she stressed the importance of education to Ghanaian citizens.

Politics 
Cudjoe-Ghansah contested and won the National Democratic Congress parliamentary seat for Ada Constituency in the Greater Accra Region. She won this seat during the 2016 Ghanaian general elections. Three other candidates namely Kanor Saakey of the New Patriotic Party, Asupah Manasseh of National Democratic Party and Daniel Katey Ossah of Convention People's Party  also contested in the 2016 by-election of Ada constituency held in 2016. Cudjoe-Ghansah won the election by obtaining 18,954 votes out of the 23,570 cast, representing 80.42 percent of total valid votes.  In 2020 Cudjoe-Ghansah retained her seat, with 27,591 votes, gaining 82.14% of the votes cast for the Ada seat in Parliament.

Personal life 
She is a Christian who is married with six children. She has spoken at events which have sought to bring religious cohesiveness to the area, praising the peace within Ghana.

References 

Living people
1967 births
National Democratic Congress (Ghana) politicians
Government ministers of Ghana
Women government ministers of Ghana
Women members of the Parliament of Ghana
Ghanaian MPs 2009–2013
Ghanaian MPs 2013–2017
Ghanaian MPs 2017–2021
Ghanaian MPs 2021–2025
21st-century Ghanaian women politicians